Portrait of Clare is a 1950 black and white British drama film directed by Lance Comfort and starring Margaret Johnston, Richard Todd, Robin Bailey and Ronald Howard, and based on the 1927 novel of the same name written by Francis Brett Young .

Plot
The film is begins in a large country mansion owned by the Hingstons and is set just after the Second world War. Lady Hingston starts to recall her youth to a young granddaughter Sylvia,

The story is then told in flashback, returning first to around 1900. The family lawyer Mr Wilburn declares his love of Clare to her grandmother. However she enters and announces her engagement to Ralph Hingston.

They marry but Ralph drowns as she watches him following a fall from a weir while trout fishing. Clare gives birth to a son soon after. They name him Steven.

The story jumps by around 5 years: steven is about to go to school. She goes with Wilburn to take him to a boarding school. Wilburn asks her to marry him on the drive home.

She meets his best friend Robert Hart (also a lawyer) on a train one day and clearly cares for him. He is best man at her marriage to Wilburn. Steven is only told when he returns from school for the Christmas holidays. He is quite upset. He begins keeping secrets and is openly defiant to Wilburn. He accuses Wilburn of marrying his mother for her money. He is locked in his room with no supper. Steven escapes out of the window and disappears into a dark stormy night. Wilburn shows no concern at all but Robert (who is visiting) goes to search. He has run to his grandmother's house.

In Wilburn's office Wilburn & Mayhew in West Bromwich his partner Ernest Mayhew commits suicide after embezzling funds. The police arrive but Wilburn is only interested in the good name of his firm. He initially hides the suicide note. Robert apologises to the police on his behalf. Wilburn realises that Clare only married him to give Steven a father and they should part from their loveless marriage.

We do not see Hart marry Clare. Steven refers to him as "Uncle Robert" in one of the final scenes.

Cast
 Margaret Johnston as Clare Hingston
 Richard Todd as Robert Hart
 Robin Bailey as Dudley Wilburn
 Ronald Howard as Ralph Hingston
 Jeremy Spenser as the teenage Steven Hingston
 Marjorie Fielding as Aunt Cathie
 Molly Urquhart as Thirza the maid
 Beckett Bould as Bissell
 Anthony Nicholls as Doctor Boyd
 Lloyd Pearson as Sir Joseph Hingston
 Mary Clare as Lady Hingston
 S. Griffiths-Moss as Bates
 Campbell Copelin as Inspector Cunningham
 Bruce Seton as Lord Steven Wolverbury
 Yvonne Andre as Marguerite
 Anne Gunning as Sylvia
 Grace Arnold as Lady Astill
 Robert Adair as Sir Joseph Astill
 Charles Paton as the Registrar
 Amy Veness as lady on train
 Hugh Morton as Ernest Mayhew
 Griffiths Moss as Bates

Critical reception
TV Guide wrote, "the story suffers from a slack pace, though Johnston adds a lot of charm and sincerity to her role."

References

External links

1950 films
British crime drama films
British historical films
1950 crime drama films
Films based on British novels
1950s historical films
Films shot at Associated British Studios
1950s English-language films
Films directed by Lance Comfort
British black-and-white films
1950s British films